This list of prehistoric bony fish is an attempt to create a comprehensive listing of all genera from the fossil record that have ever been considered to be bony fish (class Osteichthyes), excluding purely vernacular terms. The list includes all commonly accepted genera, but also genera that are now considered invalid, doubtful (nomina dubia), or were not formally published (nomina nuda), as well as junior synonyms of more established names, and genera that are no longer considered members of osteichthyes.

This list includes 1,387 generic names.

Extinct genera are marked with a dagger (†).
Extant genera are bolded.

Naming conventions and terminology
Naming conventions and terminology follow the International Code of Zoological Nomenclature. Technical terms used include:
 Junior synonym: A name which describes the same taxon as a previously published name. If two or more genera are formally designated and the type specimens are later assigned to the same genus, the first to be published (in chronological order) is the senior synonym, and all other instances are junior synonyms. Senior synonyms are generally used, except by special decision of the ICZN, but junior synonyms cannot be used again, even if deprecated. Junior synonymy is often subjective, unless the genera described were both based on the same type specimen.
Nomen nudum (Latin for "naked name"): A name that has appeared in print but has not yet been formally published by the standards of the ICZN. Nomina nuda (the plural form) are invalid, and are therefore not italicized as a proper generic name would be. If the name is later formally published, that name is no longer a nomen nudum and will be italicized on this list. Often, the formally published name will differ from any nomina nuda that describe the same specimen.
Nomen oblitum (Latin for "forgotten name"): A name that has not been used in the scientific community for more than fifty years after its original proposal.
Preoccupied name: A name that is formally published, but which has already been used for another taxon. This second use is invalid (as are all subsequent uses) and the name must be replaced. As preoccupied names are not valid generic names, they will also go unitalicized on this list.
Nomen dubium (Latin for "dubious name"): A name describing a fossil with no unique diagnostic features. As this can be an extremely subjective and controversial designation, this term is not used on this list.

A

†Abadzekhia
†Absalomichthys
Acanthognathus
†Acanthonemus
Acanthonotus
†Acanthopleurus
†Acanthopygaeus
Acanthurus
Acentrogobius
†Acentrophorus
†Acestrus
Achiurus
Achoania
†Achrestogrammus
Acipenser
†Acrogaster
†Acrognathus
†Acrolepis
Acropoma
†Acrotemnus
†Adriacentrus
†Aeduella
†Aegicephalichthys
†Aeoliscoides
Aeoliscus
†Aethalionopsis
†Aetheodontus
†Aetheolepis
†Aetheretmon
†Africentrum
†Aglyptorhynchus
Agonus
†Ainia
†Aipichthyoides
†Aipichthys
†Albertonia
Albula
†Alcoveria
Alectis
Alepes
Alepisaurus
†Alisea
†Alleiolepis
†Allelepidotus
†Allenypterus
†Alloberyx
†Allolepidotus
Allomorone
Allosmerus
†Allothrissops
Alosa
Alutera
†Aluvarus
Amanses
†Amblypterina
†Amblypterus
†Amiopsis
Ammodytes
†Ampheristus
†Amphiperca
Amphistichus
†Amphistium
†Anaethalion
†Analectis
Anarhichas
Anarrhichthys
Anchoa
†Andreolepis
†Angatubichthys
†Angolaichthys
Anguilla
†Anguillavus
†Anguilloides
Anisotremus
†Ankylophorus
†Annaichthys
†Anomoeodus
Antennarius
Antigonia
†Antofagastaichthys
†Apateodus
†Apateolepis
†Apateopholis
†Aphanepygus
†Aphelolepis
Aphia
†Aphnelepis
Aplodinotus
Apogon
†Apogonoides
Apolectus
Apsilus
†Apsopelix
Aracana
Araeosteus
†Aramichthys
†Araripichthys
†Archaeolepidotus
†Archaeomaene
†Archaeosemionotus
†Archaephippus
†Archaeus
†Arctosomus
†Ardiodus
†Ardoreosomus
Argentina
†Argillichthys
†Argilloberyx
Argyripnus
Argyropelecus
Argyrosomus
Ariomma
Ariosoma
Arius
Arnoglossus
†Arratiaichthys
Artedius
†Asarotus
†Ascalobos
†Asialepidotus
†Asima
†Asineops
†Aspidorhynchus
†Asthenocormus
Astronesthes
†Atacamichthys
Ateleopus
Atheresthes
Atherina
Atherinopsis
†Athrodon
†Atopocephala
†Aulolepis
†Aulopopsis
Aulopus
†Aulorhamphus
Aulorhynchus
†Aulostomoides
Aulostomus
†Australosomus
†Austroclupea
†Austrolepidotus
Austrophycis
†Austropleuropholis
†Avitolabrax
†Avitoluvarus
†Axelia
†Axelrodichthys

B

Bairdiella
†Bajaichthys
†Baleiichthys
Balistes
†Balistomorphus
†Bananogmius
†Barcarenichthyes
Bassozetus
Bathyclupea
Bathygadus
†Bathylagus
†Bathysoma
Batrachoides
†Bawitius
†Beaumontoperca
†Beerichthys
†Beishanichthys
Belone
†Belonostomus
†Beltanodus
Bembrops
†Bendenius
Benthocomectes
Benthosema
†Berybolcensis
†Berycomorus
†Berycopsia
†Berycopsis
Beryx
†Besania
†Bilinia
†Birgeria
†Blabe
Blennius
†Blochius
†Bobasatrania
†Bobbichthys
Bodianus
†Bolbocara
†Bolcanguilla
†Bolcyrus
Bolinichthyes
†Bonnerichthys
Boops
†Boreichthys
†Boreolepis
†Boreosomus
Bothus
Brachionichthys
†Brachydegma
Brachydeuterus
†Brachypareion
Brama
†Bramoides
Branchiostegus
†Brannerion
†Bregmacerinia
Bregmaceros
†Brembodus
†Brookvalia
Brosme
Brosmius
Brotula
†Broughia
†Broweria
†Browneichthys
†Brychaetus
Buglossidium
†Burbonella
†Burtinia

C

Caesio
†Caeus
†Calamostoma
Calamus
Callionymus
†Callipteryx
Callyodon
Calotomus
†Candelarialepis
†Canningius
†Canobius
†Caproberyx
Capros
†Caprovesposus
†Carangodes
†Carangopsis
Caranx
Carapus
†Caridosuctor
†Carpathichthys
†Carsothrissops
†Caruichthys
†Casierius
†Casieroides
†Caturus
Centracanthus
Centriscus
Centroberyx
Centropomus
Centropristis
†Cephaloxenus
Cepola
†Ceramurus
†Ceratoichthys
Ceratoscopelus
Chaetodon
Chaeturichthys
†Chagrinia
†Chalcidichthys
Chanda (fish)
†Changxingia
†Chanopsis
Chanos
†Chardonius
†Charitopsis
†Charitosomus
†Charleuxia
Chauliodus
†Chaunax
Cheilinus
†Cheirodopsis
†Cheirothrix
Chelmon
†Chibapsetta
†Chichia
Chilara
Chilomycterus
†Chirocentrites
Chirocentrus
†Chirodipterus
Chirostoma
Chitonotus
Chlorophthalmus
†Chondrosteus
†Chongichthys
Chromis
†Chrotichthys
†Chrysolepis
†Chungkingichthys
†Cimolichthys
†Cipactlichthys
Citharichthys
Citharus
†Cladocyclus
†Cleithrolepis
Clidoderma
Clinus
†Clupavus
Clupea
Cobitopsis
†Coccocephalichthys
†Coccoderma
†Coccodus
†Coccolepis
†Coelacanthopsis
†Coelacanthus
†Coelodus
†Coelogaster
Coelorhynchus
†Colobodus
Colpichthyes
†Conchodus
Conger
Coriops
†Cornuboniscus
†Corunegenys
Coryphaenoides
†Coryphaenopsis
Coryphopterus
†Cosmolepis
†Cosmoptychius
Cottopsis
Crenidens
†Crenilepis
†Cretatriacanthus
†Cretazeus
†Cristigerina
†Crossognathus
†Cryptobalistes
†Cryptoberyx
†Cryptolepis
Ctenoberyx
†Ctenocephalichthys
†Ctenodentex
†Ctenognathichthys
†Ctenopomichthys
Ctenosciaena
†Ctenothrissa
†Cualabaea
Cubiceps
Cyclopoma
Cyclopterus
†Cycloptychius
Cyclothone
†Cylindracanthus
Cymatogaster
Cynoscion
†Cyranichthys
†Cyranorhis
†Cyttoides

D

†Dactylopogon
Dactyloptena
Dactylopterus
†Daedalichthys
†Daitingichthys
†Dalmatichthys
†Dalpiazella
Damalichthys
Danaphos
†Danatinia
†Dandya
Dannevigia
†Dapalis
†Dapaloides
†Dapedium
†Dastilbe
†Davichthys
Decapterus
†Decazella
Deltentosteus
Dentex
†Deprandus
†Dercetis
†Dercetoides
Dermatopsis
†Devonesteus
†Devonosteus
†Diabolepis
†Dialiipina
Diaphus
†Diaphyodus
Dibranchus
†Dicellopyge
Dicologoglossa
†Dictyopyge
†Digoria
†Dimorpholepis
†Dinelops
†Dinopteryx
Diodon
Diplacanthopoma
†Diplocercides
Diplodus
†Dipnorhynchus
†Dipterichthys
†Dipteronotus
†Dipterus
Dipulus
Diretmus
†Discordichthys
†Dollopterus
†Domeykos
†Dorsetichthys
†Dorsolepis
†Dorypterus
†Drimys
†Drydenius
†Ductor
†Dwykia

E

†Eastmanalepes
†Ebenaqua
Echelus
Echeneis (fish)
†Echidnocephalus
Echiodon
†Eclipes
†Ecrinesomus
†Ectasis
†Ectosteorhachis
†Egertonia
†Eichstaettia
†Eigilia
Electrona
†Elonichthys
†Elopoides
†Elopopsis
Elops
†Elpistoichthys
Emmelichthys
†Enchelion
†Enchelurus
†Enchelyolepis
†Enchodus
Engraulis
†Engycolobodus
†Enigmatichthys
†Enischnorhynchus
†Enniskillenus
Enophrys
†Enoplophthalmus
Enoplosus
†Eoanguilla
†Eoaulostomus
†Eobothus
†Eobuglossus
†Eochondrosteus
†Eocoelopoma
†Eocottus
†Eodiaphyodus
†Eodiodon
†Eoeugnathus
†Eoholocentrum
†Eokrefftia
†Eolabroides
†Eolactoria
†Eolamprogrammus
†Eolates
†Eolophotes
†Eoluvarus
†Eomesodon
†Eomuraena
†Eomyctophum
Eomyrophis
†Eomyrus
†Eopeyeria
†Eophycis
†Eoplatax
†Eoplectus
†Eoprotelops
Eopsetta
†Eosalmo
†Eosaurichthys
†Eosemionotus
†Eoserranus
†Eospinus
†Eosynanceja
†Eotetraodon
†Eothynnus
†Eothyrstites
†Eotrigonodon
†Eozanclus
Epigonus
Epinephelus
Epinnula
†Eriquius
†Erugocentrus
†Esocelops
†Etringus
Etrumeus
†Eubiodectes
†Eugnathides
Euleptorhamphus
Eulichthys
†Euporosteus
†Eurycormus
†Eurynotoides
†Eurypholis
†Eurystichthys
†Eusemius
†Eusthenopteron
Euthynnus
†Euthynotus
†Eutrichiurides
Eutrigla
†Evenkia
Evermanella
†Evesthes
Exallias
†Exellia
†Exocoetoides

F

†Felberia
†Ferganiscus
†Ferganoceratodus
†Feroxichthys
Fistularia
†Fistularioides
†Fleurantia
†Flindersicthys
†Flugopterus
†Foreyia
†Frodoichthys
†Fukangichthys
†Furo
†Fuyuanichthys
†Fuyuanperleidus

G

†Gabanellia
†Gadella
Gadiculus
Gadomus
Gadus
Gaidropsarus
†Ganoessus
†Ganolytes
†Ganorhynchus
†Gardinerichthys
†Gardinerpiscis
†Garnbergia
†Gasteroclupea
†Gasterorhamphosus
Gasterosteus
†Gaudryella
†Gazolapodus
Gazza
Gempylus
Genyonemus
Genypterus
Gephyroberyx
Gerres
†Geryonichthys
†Gharbouria
†Gibbodon
†Gigantopterus
†Gillicus
†Gillidia
†Gimlichthys
†Ginsburgia
Glaucosoma
†Globulodus
Glyptocephalus
†Glyptolepis
Glyptophidium
†Glyptopomus
†Gnathoberyx
Gnathophis
Gobius
†Gonatodus
†Goniocranion
Gonostoma
†Gosfordia
†Goslinophis
†Goudkoffia
†Gracilignathicthys
Grammatorcynus
†Graphiuricthys
†Greenwoodella
†Griphognathus
†Grossipterus
†Grypodon
†Gymnoichthys
Gymnosarda
Gymnoscopelus
†Gyrodus
†Gyrolepidoides
†Gyrolepis
†Gyronchus
†Gyroptychius
†Gyrosteus

H

†Habroichthys
†Hacquetia
†Hadronector
†Hainbergia
†Halec
†Halecopsis
Haliophis
†Haljulia
†Hamodus
†Haplolepis
Harengula
†Helgolandichthys
†Helichthys
†Helmolepis
Hemerocoetes
†Hemicalypterus
†Hemilampronites
†Hemirhabdorhynchus
Hemirhamphus
†Hemisaurida)
Hemithyrsites
†Hengnania
†Heptanema
†Heterolepidotus
†Heterostrophus
†Heterothrissa
Hildebrandia
Hippocampus
Hippoglossoides
†Hipposyngnathus
†Histionotus
†Histiothrissa
†Holocentrites
Holocentrus
†Holodipterus
†Holophagus
†Holopterygius
†Holoptychus
†Holosteus
†Homonotichthys
†Homorhynchus
Hoplichthys
Hoplobrotula
†Hoplopteryx
Hoplostethus
Hoplunnis
Hucho
†Hulettia
†Humilichthys
†Hungkiichthys
Huso
†Hydropessum
Hygophum
Hymenocephalus
Hypacanthus
Hyperoglyphe
Hyperoplus
Hyperprosopon
Hypomesus
Hyporhamphus
Hypsocormus

I

Icelinus
†Ichthyoceras
Ichthyococcus
†Ichthyodectes
†Ichthyokentema
†Ichthyotringa
†Idrissia
†Igornella
Ilisha
†Illiniichthys
†Imhoffius
†Indotrigonodon
†Inichthys
†Inocentrus
†Ionoscopus
†Ioscion
Isacia
Isopsetta
†Istieus
Istiophorus
†Isurichthys
†Izuus

J

†Jacobulus
Japonoconger
†Joleaudichthys
†Judeichthys
†Judeoberyx
†Jungersenichthys

K

†Kalops
†Kankatodus
†Kansasiella
†Kansius
†Karaunguria
†Kargalichthys
†Kellia
†Kentuckia
†Khantausia
†Kichkassia
†Knightia
†Koonwarria
†Korutichthys
Kryptophaneron
Kuhlia
†Kushlukia
†Kyphosichthys
Kyphosida
†Kyrtogymnodon

L

Labrisomus
Labrodon
†Labrophagus
Labrus
Lactarius
Laemonema
Lampadena
Lampanyctodes
Lampanyctus
Lampichthyes
Lampris
†Landanichthys
Larimus
†Latvius
†Laugia
†Laytonia
†Lebonichthyes
†Lednevia
†Leedsichthys
†Legnonotus
†Lehmanotus
Leiognathus/Lepidion
Lepidocottus
†Lepidogobius
Lepidopus
Lepidorhombus
Lepidotrigla
†Lepidotus
Lepisosteus
Lepophidium
†Leptecodon
Leptocottus
†Leptolepides
Leptolepis
Leptoscopus
†Lestidiops
Lethops
Leuresthes
†Libanoberyx
†Libotonius
†Libys
†Ligulalepis
†Ligulella
Limanda
†Liodesmus
†Lirosceles
†Lissoberyx
Lithognathus
†Litoptychius
Liza
Lobianchia
†Lobopterus
†Lochmocereus
†Lompoquia
Lonchistium
†Lophar
†Lophiostomus
Lophius
†Lophosteus
Lota
†Lualabaea
†Luederia
†Luganoia
†Luisichthys
†Luisiella
†Lusitanichthys
Luvarus
†Luxilites
Lycodopsis
Lyconectes
†Lycoptera
Lyopsetta
†Lyrolepis

M

Maccullochella
†Macrepistius
†Macroaulostomus
†Macropoma
†Macropomoides
†Macrosemius
†Macrosemimimus
Macruronus
†Madariscus
Makaira
Malacocottus
†Malacopygaeus
Mallotus
†Manlietta
Marosichthys
†Martinichthys
Mastygocercus
Matarchia
Maulisia
Maurolicus
Megalops
†Megapomus
†Megistolepis
†Meidiichthys
†Meisenheimichthys
Melamphaes
†Melanognathus
Melanogrammus
Melanonus
Mene
Menidia
Menticirrhus
†Meridensia
Merlangius
Merluccius
†Mesoclupea
†Mesolepis
†Mesturus
†Microcapros
†Microceratodus
Microchirus
Microgadus
Micromesistius
†Micromyrus
†Micropycnodon
Microstomus
†Miguashaia
†Milananguilla
†Mimipiscis
†Mioplosus
Mola
Molva
Monocentris
Monochirus
Monolene
Monomitopus
†Moorevillia
Morone
†Morrolepis
†Moythomasia
Mugil
Mullus
Mupus
Muraena
Muraenesox
Myctophum
†Mylacanthus
†Mylomyrus
Myripristis
Myroconger
Mystriophis

N

†Namatozodia
†Nannolepis
Nansenia
†Nardoichthys
Naso
†Natlandia
†Naupygus
†Naxilepis
Neanthias
Nebris
†Nematonotus
†Nematoptychius
Neobythites
†Neocassandra
Neoceratodus
†Neocybium
†Neohalecopsis
†Neopachycormus
†Neopholidophoropsis
Neoplatycephalus
†Neorhombolepis
Neoscombrops
†Nephrotus
Nerophis
†Nesides
Nettastoma
†Neuburgella
Nezumia
†Nielsenia
†Niobrara
†Nolfophidion
Notacanthus
†Notagogus
†Notelops
Notesthes
†Notogoneus
Notolepis
Notoscopelus
†Nozamichthys
†Nursallia
†Nybelinoides

O

Oblada
†Occithrissops
†Ocystias
†Odmdenia
†Odonteabolca
Ogcocephalus
Ogilbia
†Ohuus
†Oligobalistes
†Oligodiodon
†Oligolactoria
†Oligolophotes
†Oligopleura
†Oligopleurus
Oligoplites
Oligopus
†Omosoma
†Omosomopsis
†Oncolepis
Oncorhynchus
Onuxodon
†Onychodus
Ophidion
Ophiodon
†Ophiopsis
Ophisthoproctus
Ophisurus
†Opisthomyzon
Opisthonema
†Opistopteryx
Oplegnathus
†Opsithrissops
Optivus
†Oreochima
†Ornategulum
†Orthocormus
Orthopristis
†Orthurus
†Orvikuina
†Oshunia
†Osmeroides
Osmerus
†Osorioichthys
†Ospia
†Ostariostoma
†Osteolepis
†Osteorachis
Ostracion
Ostracoberyx
†Otomitla
Oxyjulis

P

†Pachycormus
†Pachyrizodus
†Pachythrissops
†Pachytrissops
Pagellus
Pagrus
†Palaedaphus
†Palaeoatherina
†Palaeobalistum
†Palaeocentrotus
†Palaeocyttus
†Palaeogadus
†Palaeolycus
†Palaeomolva
†Palaeomyrus
†Palaeoniscum
†Palaeoperca
†Palaeopercichthys
†Palaeophichthys
†Palaeorhynchus
†Palaeothrissum
†Palaeothunnus
†Paleopsephurus
†Palimphyes
†Panderichthys
†Pantophilus
Panturichthys
†Paraberyx
†Paracalamus
†Paracentrophorus
†Paraceratodus
Paraconger
†Paracongroides
†Paradrydenius
†Paraeoliscus
†Paragonatodus
†Paraipichthys
†Paralbula
†Paralepidosteus
†Paralepidotus
Paralepis
Paralichthys
†Paralogoniscus
†Paramblypterus
†Paramesolepis
†Paramphisile
†Paranguilla
†Paranogmius
Parapercis
†Paraperleidus
†Parapholidophorus
Paraplagusia
†Paraplatax
†Parapleuropholis
Parapristopoma
†Parapygaeus
†Pararhenanoperca
†Parascopelus
†Parasemionotus
†Parasphyraena
†Parasynarcualis
†Paratarpon
†Paratarrasius
†Paratichthys
†Paratrachinotus
Paratrisopterus
†Paravinciguerria
†Parechelus
†Parenchodus
Parophrys
†Parospinus
Parvilux
†Pasaichthys
†Patavichthys
†Pateroperca
†Pattersonichthys
†Pattersonoberyx
Pegusa
†Peipiaosteus
†Pelargorhynchus
Pelates
†Peltoperleidus
†Peltopleurus
Pempheris
Pennahia
Pentaceros
Pentanemus
Pentaprion
Percalates
†Percostoma
†Pericentrophus
†Peripeltopleurus
Peristedion
†Perleidus
Perulibatrachus
†Petalopteryx
Phanerodon
†Phanerosteon
†Pharmacichthys
†Phoenicolepis
†Pholidoctenus
†Pholidolepis
†Pholidophoretes
†Pholidophoristion
†Pholidophoroides
†Pholidophoropsis
†Pholidophorus
†Pholidopleurus
†Pholidorhynchodon
†Phosphichthys
Photichthys
Phycis
†Phylactocephalus
†Phyllodus
Physiculus
†Pillararhynchus
Pimelometopon
†Pinichthys
†Pirskenius
†Pisdurodon
Pisodonophis
†Piveteauia
†Placopleurus
†Plagioholocentrum
Platax
Platichthys
†Platinx
Platycephalus
†Platylaemus
†Platylates
†Platysiagum
†Platysomus
†Plectocretacicus
Plectorhinchus
Plectrites
Plectrypops
†Plegmolepis
†Plesioberyx
†Plesiococcolepis
†Plesiolepidotus
†Plesioperleidus
†Plesioserranus
†Plethodus
Pleuronichthys
†Pleuropholis
†Pliodetes
†Podocephalus
Podothecus
Pogonias
Pollachius
Polydactylus
†Polygyrodus
†Polyipnoides
Polyipnus
Polymetme
Polymetmeglareosus
Polymixia
†Polyosteorhynchus
†Polzbergia
Pomacanthus
Pomadasys
Pomolobus
Pontinus
Porichthys
†Porolepis
Poromitra
†Powichthys
†Praewoodsia
†Pranesus
†Prevolitans
†Priacanthopsis
Priacanthus
†Prionolepis
†Prionopleurus
Prionotus
†Priscacara
Pristigenys
†Pristiosomus
†Proaracana
†Proargentina
†Procheirichthys
†Prodiodon
†Progempylus
†Progymnodon
†Prohalecites
†Prolates
†Prolepidotus
†Proleptolepis
†Proluvarus
†Promegalops
†Pronotacanthus
†Propercarina
†Propteridium
†Propterus
†Prosauropsis
†Proscinetes
†Proserranus
†Proserrivomer
†Prosolenostomus
Prosopium
†Protacanthodes
†Protamblyptera
†Protanthias
†Protarpon
Protaulopsis
†Protautoga
†Protelops
†Proteomyrus
†Protobalistium
†Protobrama
†Protobrotula
†Protoclupea
Protolophotus
Protomyctophum
†Protorhamphosus
†Protoscaphirhynchus
†Protosphyraena
†Protostomias
†Protriacanthus
†Prymnetes
Psenes
†Psenicubiceps
†Psephurus
Psettodes
†Psettopsis
†Pseudholocentrum
†Pseudoberyx
†Pseudoegertonia
Pseudohilsa
Pseudohistiophorus
†Pseudoellimma
†Pseudoleptolepis
Pseudophichthyes
Pseudophycis
†Pseudoraniceps
Pseudoscaris
Pseudoscopelus
†Pseudoseriola
†Pseudosphaerodon
†Pseudosyngnathus
†Pseudotetrapterus
†Pseudoumbrina
†Pseudovomer
Pseudoxenomystax
†Psilichthys
†Pteronisculus
†Pteroniscus
Pterothrissus
†Pterygocephalus
†Ptycholepis
Pungitius
Pycnodus
†Pycnosterinx
†Pycnosteroides
†Pygaeus
†Pygopterus

Q

†Qingmenodus
†Qingshania
†Quayia
†Quebecius
†Quisque

R

Rachycentron
Radulinus
†Ramallichthys
†Ramphosus
Raniceps
†Rankinian
†Rebellatrix
†Retodus
Rexea
†Rhabdoderma
†Rhabdofario
†Rhabdolepis
Rhacochilus
†Rhacolepis
†Rhadinichthys
†Rhamphexocoetus
†Rhamphognathus
†Rharbichthys
Rhechias
†Rhenanoperca
†Rhinocephalus
†Rhinodipterus
†Rhipis
†Rhizodus
Rhynchoconger
†Rhynchocymba
†Rhynchodercetis
†Rhynchorinus
†Rhythmias
†Robustichthys
Roncador
†Roslerichthys
†Rubiesichthys
†Rhynchodipterus

S

Saccogaster
†Sahelinia
†Sakamenichthys
†Salminops
Salmo
Salvelinus
†Sangiorgioichthys
†Santanaclupea
Sarda
Sardina
Sardinella
†Sardinius
†Sardinoides
Sardinops
Sargocentron
†Sargodon
Sargus
Sarmatella
†Sassenia
†Saurichthys
†Saurocephalus
†Saurodon
†Sauropsis
†Saurorhamphus
†Saurorhynchus
†Saurostomus
Scalanago
†Scanilepis
Scarus
Scatophagus
†Schaefferius
†Scheenstia
†Schizurichthys
Sciaena
Sciaenops
†Sciaenurus
†Sciaenuropsis
†Scleracanthus
Scomber
Scomberesox
Scomberoides
Scomberomorus
†Scombramphodon
†Scombrinus
†Scombroclupea
Scombrops
†Scombrosarda
†Scombrosphyraena
Scopelarchus
Scopelogadus
†Scopeloides
Scopelopsis
Scopelosaurus
†Scopulipiscis
Scophthalmus
Scorpaena
Scorpaenichthys
Sebastes
†Sebastodes
†Sedenhorstia
†Seefeldia
Selar
Selenaspis
†Semiolepis
†Semionotus
†Seriola
Seriphus
†Serranopsis
Serranus
†Serrolepis
†Siganopygaeus
Sillaginoides
Sillago
†Sinocoelacanthus
†Sinoeugnathus
†Sinoniscus
†Sinosemionotus
Sirembo
†Smilodonichthys
Solea (fish)
†Solenorhynchus
Solenostomus
†Songanella
Sparisoma
†Sparnodus
Sparus
†Spathiurus
†Spermatodus
†Sphenocephalus
Sphyraena
†Sphyraenodus
Sphyraenops
Spicara
†Spinacanthus
Spirinchus
†Sponysedrion
†Spratticeps
Squalogadus
†Stegotrachelus
†Stemmatodus
Stenatherina
Stenobrachius
†Stensioonotus
Sternoptyx
†Stichoberyx
†Stichocentrus
†Stichopterus
†Stichopteryx
Stolephorus
†Stomiahykus
†Stoppania
†Stratodus
†Strepeoschema
Stromateus
†Stromerichthys
†Strongylosteus
†Strunius
†Styloichthyes
†Styracopterus
†Sundayichthys
Symbolophorus
Symphodus
Symphurus
Synagrops
Syngnathus
†Synhypuralis
Synodus
†Syntengmodus

T

†Tachynectes
Taenioconger
Tarletonbeania
†Tarrasius
†Teffichthys
†Tegeolepis
†Telepholis
†Tenuicentrum
Teratichthys
†Tetragonolepis
Tetragonurus
Tetraodon
†Tetrapterus
†Thalattorhynchus
†Tharrhias
†Tharsis
†Thaumaturus
Theragra
†Thomasinotus
†Thoracopterus
†Thrissops
Thunnus
†Thursius
Thymallus
†Thyrsion
†Thyrsitocephalus
†Thyrsocles
†Tibetodus
†Ticinepomis
†Ticinolepis
†Tienshaniscus
†Tiktaalik
†Todiltia
Toxotes
†Trachelacanthus
†Trachicaranx
†Trachichythyoides
Trachinus
Trachurus
Trachyrhinchus
†Trachymetopon
†Trewavasia
Triacanthus
†Trichiurichthys
Trichiurus
†Trichurides
Trigla
†Trigonodon
Triodon
†Tripelta
Triphoturus
Tripterophycis
Tripterygion
Trisopterus
†Tselfatia
†Tubantia
†Tungtingichthys
†Tungusichthys
†Tunita
†Turahbuglossus
†Turkmene
†Turseodus
†Tylerichthys

U

†Uarbryichthys
Umbra
Umbrina
†Undina
†Uranolophus
Uranoscopus
†Urenchelys
Uroconger
Urophycis
†Urosphen
†Urosphenopsis
†Urosthenes
†Uydenia
†Uydenichthys

V

Valenciennellus
†Varasichthys
†Varialepis
Velifer
Ventrifossa
Verilus
†Veronanguilla
†Veronavelifer
Vinciguerria
†Vinctifer
†Volcichthys
†Voltaconger
†Vomeropsis

W

†Wadeichthys
†Wangia
†Wardichthys
†Watsonichthyes
†Watsonulus
†Wendyichths
†Westollia
†Wetherellus
†Whitapodus
†Whiteia
†Whiteichthys
†Willomorichthys
†Wimania

X

Xenistius
†Xiphactinus
Xiphias
†Xiphiorhynchus
†Xiphopterus
†Xyne

Y

†Yonngichthys
†Youngolepis
†Yuchoulepis
†Yungkangichthys

Z

†Zanclites
Zanclus
Zaniolepis
†Zaphlegulus
Zenion
Zenopsis
†Zeuchthiscus
Zeus
†Zignoichthys
Zoarces

See also

 Bony fish
 Prehistoric fish
 List of sarcopterygians
 List of prehistoric cartilaginous fish
 List of prehistoric jawless fish

References

Uncited genera can be attributed to the following:

External links
 Paleobiology Database entry on Osteichthyes

 List
Osteichthyes